The Electoral district of Toowoomba East was an electoral district of the Legislative Assembly in the Australian state of Queensland. It was created with the 1960 redistribution and removed by the 1972 redistribution.

The seat was based on the City of Toowoomba.

The member for Toowoomba, Mervyn Anderson successfully stood for election in Toowoomba East in 1960 after his previous seat was lost in the redistribution.

The sitting member, Peter Wood, successfully stood for election in the new seat of Toowoomba South in the 1972 election.

Members for Toowoomba East
The members for Toowoomba East were:

Election results

See also
 Electoral districts of Queensland
 Members of the Queensland Legislative Assembly by year
 :Category:Members of the Queensland Legislative Assembly by name

References

Darling Downs
Toowoomba
Toowoomba East
Toowoomba East
Toowoomba East
Constituencies established in 1960
Constituencies disestablished in 1972